Clifford James Cullen (born November 8, 1962) is a Canadian politician and member of the Legislative Assembly of Manitoba for Spruce Woods, currently serving as the Deputy Premier of Manitoba and Minister of Economic Development, Investment and Trade. He was first elected in a by-election held in the summer of 2004, and was re-elected in 2007, 2011, 2016, and 2019.

Early life and education
Cullen was raised on a farm near Wawanesa, Manitoba, and subsequently attended the University of Manitoba, where he received a Diploma in Agriculture.  He worked in the agricultural and environmental sectors, and also has experience as an insurance broker.

Political career
When Turtle Mountain MLA Mervin Tweed resigned from the provincial legislature in 2004 to run as a candidate in the 2004 Canadian federal election, Cullen sought and won the Progressive Conservative Party of Manitoba nomination to succeed him. Cullen was elected with about 60% of the popular vote on June 29, 2004.

The Turtle Mountain constituency was abolished for the 2011 provincial election, and Cullen sought election in Spruce Woods, which absorbed the western portion of Turtle Mountain.  He won easily with 66 percent of the vote.

On May 3, 2016, Cullen was appointed to the Executive Council of Manitoba as Minister of Growth, Enterprise and Trade.

Cullen was named Minister of Crown Services and Government House Leader as part of a cabinet shuffle on August 17, 2017.

On August 1, 2018, Cullen was named Minister of Justice and Attorney General.

On January 5, 2021, Cullen was named Minister of Education.

Personal life
Cullen makes his home in the Glenboro area with his wife Marilyn and three sons.

References

1962 births
Living people
Progressive Conservative Party of Manitoba MLAs
Members of the Executive Council of Manitoba
Deputy premiers of Manitoba
University of Manitoba alumni
21st-century Canadian politicians
Place of birth missing (living people)